Gusanagyugh is a village in the Ani Municipality of the Shirak Province of Armenia. In 1977, it was renamed after the bard "Gusan" Nakhshikar Sargis.

Development programs 
Gusanagyush village became part of COAF-supported villages (Children of Armenia Fund).

The programs implemented include: Student Councils, Debate Clubs, Health and Lifestyle Education, School Nutrition & Brushodromes, Women Health Screenings, Support for Reproductive Health.

Children of Armenia Fund also renovated village facilities such as cafeteria and Brushodrome.

Demographics

References 

Populated places in Shirak Province